Jumprava Parish is an administrative unit of Ogre Municipality in the Vidzeme region of Latvia. The administrative center is Jumprava village.

Towns, villages and settlements of Jumprava parish 
 Dzelmes
 Jumprava
 Viešļi

References

External links

Parishes of Latvia
Ogre Municipality
Vidzeme